Luca Fiordiani (born 10 June 1992) is an Italian footballer who plays for Bastia.

Biography
Born in Foligno, in the Province of Perugia, Umbria region, Fiordiani started his career at Perugia Giovane. He then joined Perugia Calcio. He was the member of the under-17 team in 2008–09 season. The club folded in 2010. However Fiordiani joined the new company which was admitted in 2010–11 Serie D. Fiordiani left for Deruta in 2011–12 Serie D. He was signed by Lega Pro 2nd Division club Foligno in mid-2012. Fiordiani was signed by Parma on 31 January 2013 in co-ownership deal for €75,000. He immediately returned to Foligno. On 20 June 2013 Parma acquired Fiordiani outright for undisclosed fee. On 14 August 2013 he was signed by Gavorrano along with Matteo Bellucci, Simon Gentili, Federico Meacci and Tiziano Scarfagna.

References

External links
 AIC profile (data by football.it) 
 Luca Fiordiani at Footballdatabase

Italian footballers
A.C. Perugia Calcio players
A.S.D. Città di Foligno 1928 players
Parma Calcio 1913 players
U.S. Gavorrano players
Serie C players
Association football midfielders
People from Foligno
1992 births
Living people
Sportspeople from the Province of Perugia
Footballers from Umbria